The 2015 season has been Pahang FA's 12th season in the Malaysia Super League. Parang began the season on 31 January 2015, with the opening game of their Malaysia Super League campaign. They also competed in the three domestic cups: the Malaysia FA Cup, the Malaysia Cup and the Malaysia Charity Shield.

Club

Current coaching staff

Kit manufacturers and sponsors

Competitions

Overview

Malaysia Super League

League table

Matches

Malaysia FA Cup

AFC Cup

Group stage

Knock-out stage 

The Persipura Jayapura v Pahang match was not played as scheduled as Pahang players were denied entry into Indonesia due to visa issues. The AFC announced on 10 June 2015 that as a result, Persipura Jayapura forfeited the match and was considered to have lost the match by 3–0, based on the AFC Cup 2015 Competition Regulations and the AFC Disciplinary Code.

First team and squad statistics

Scoring records
 First goal of the season
Super League: Matías Conti against Selangor (56th minute) (14 February 2015) 
FA Cup: Matías Conti against Johor DT (20th minute) (2 March 2015) 
Malaysia Cup: TBA
AFC Cup: Dickson Nwakaeme against Yadanarbon (6th minute) (25 February 2015)

 Fastest goal of the season
Super League: D. Saarvindran against PDRM (6th minute) (20 June 2015) 
FA Cup: Matías Conti against Kelantan FA (2nd minute) (9 May 2015) 
Malaysia Cup: TBA
AFC Cup: Dickson Nwakaeme against Yadanarbon (6th minute) (25 February 2015)

Biggest win
Super League: against PDRM (5-3) (20 June 2015)
FA Cup: TBA
Malaysia Cup: TBA
AFC Cup: against Yadanarbon (7–4) (29 April 2015)

Biggest loss
Super League: against Johor DT (0–2) (31 January 2015) against Lions XII [4-2]
FA Cup: TBA
Malaysia Cup: against PKNS (1-4)
AFC Cup: against FC Istiklol [4-0]

Clean sheet

Own goal

Transfers

In

Out

Out on loan

References

External links
 Official Website

Sri Pahang FC
Sri Pahang FC seasons
2015 in Malaysian football
Malaysian football clubs 2015 season